Cn3D is a Windows, Macintosh and Unix-based software from the United States National Library of Medicine that acts as a helper application for web browsers to view three-dimensional structures from The National Center for Biotechnology Information's Entrez retrieval service. It "simultaneously displays structure, sequence, and alignment, and now has powerful annotation and alignment editing features", according to its official site. Cn3D is in public domain with source code available.

The latest version of the software 4.3.1 was released 06 Dec 2013. This version has the ability to view superpositions of 3D structures with similar biological units and an enhanced version of the Vector Alignment Search Tool (VAST).

See also

 List of molecular graphics systems
 Molecular graphics
 List of software for molecular mechanics modeling

References

External links
 Cn3D Home Page
 source code tarball of NCBI C++ toolkit which includes Cn3D

Bioinformatics software
Molecular modelling software
Free software programmed in C++
Free science software
Windows multimedia software
MacOS multimedia software
Science software for Linux
Unix Internet software
Software that uses wxWidgets